Dale Lynsey Manawa "Chief" McIntosh  (born 23 November 1969) is a former Wales international rugby union player and former rugby union coach. He was born in Tūrangi, New Zealand.

Rugby Union career

Amateur career

He played for Pontypridd.

Provincial career

McIntosh qualified to play for Scotland by virtue of a Scottish grandfather.

He played for the Scottish Exiles in the Scottish Inter-District Championship.

International career

He was capped by Scotland 'B' to play against Ireland 'B' on 28 December 1991. He was capped again by the 'B' side to play against France 'B' on 2 February 1992.

He was then capped by Scotland 'A' in 1992 and 1993. Although 'A' sides are now deemed 'capture' sides, at the time players could more easily switch nationality when captured - and McIntosh switched nationality to play for Wales when his international career seemed to stall with Scotland.

He was capped by Wales in 1996 and 1997.

Coaching career

McIntosh went on to coach in Wales after his playing career ended. He coached with Pontypridd, Cardiff Blues and Merthyr.

References

External links
Dale McIntosh profile on Ponty.net

Welsh rugby union players
New Zealand rugby union players
Wales international rugby union players
Pontypridd RFC players
1969 births
Living people
Rugby union flankers
Rugby union number eights
Rugby union locks
New Zealand expatriate sportspeople in Wales
Scotland 'B' international rugby union players
Scotland 'A' international rugby union players
Scottish Exiles (rugby union) players
People from Tūrangi
Rugby union players from Waikato